Tatiana Kuzmina (born January 10, 1990) is a Russian Taekwondo athlete who won a bronze medal at the 2017 World Taekwondo Championships.

She won 3-2 in 1/4-Final against Jirankova Iveta but lost in 1/2-Final to Iranian fighter Kimia Alizadeh.

References

1990 births
Living people
Russian female taekwondo practitioners
World Taekwondo Championships medalists
Place of birth missing (living people)
20th-century Russian women
21st-century Russian women